Adhesion is the tendency of certain dissimilar molecules to cling together.

Adhesion may also refer to:

Biology 
 Adhesion (medicine), a fibrous band that forms between tissues and organs
 Cell adhesion, the binding of a cell to another cell or to a surface or matrix
 Focal adhesion, a type of macromolecular assembly in cell biology
 Interthalamic adhesion, a band connecting the brain's two thalami
 Adhesion barrier

Other
 Rail adhesion, a type of railway
 Adhesion contract, in law
 Adhesion (Politics)

See also 
 Adhesive
 Cohesion (disambiguation)